Our Lady of Bzommar is a Marian shrine in Bzommar, Lebanon.

Bzommar is situated 36 km northeast of Beirut at an elevation ranging between 920m and 950m above the Mediterranean. It is part of the Caza of Keserwan. Bzoummar is home to a monastery of the Armenian Catholic Church that was built in 1749, where the image of Our Lady of Bzommar is venerated.

See also
 Cathedral of Our Lady of Bzommar

Keserwan District
Armenian Catholic Church in Lebanon
Armenian Catholic churches in Lebanon
Marian devotions
Titles of Mary
Tourism in Lebanon
Tourist attractions in Lebanon